Aurora Private School is a private school in Sundowner, Randburg, South Africa. It takes children from 2.5 years old to Grade 12, at which point they take exams through the Independent Examinations Board. It was originally established in 1993 as a progressive school but is now run by Curro Education.

Location
Aurora moved to its current site in 1998, having previously occupied a site in Randpark Ridge called TV Park, which now houses Willowridge Private School.

The original layout of the school had circular building complexes named after the planets of the solar system positioned around the original school hall.

The new school building continues with the space theme. The school is flanked by two sporting grounds, Galaxy Park and Dream Park. Despite subsequently changing, it was originally intended that Mercury house grade 0 (grade R), Venus house grades 1–3, Mars house grades 4–6, Jupiter house grades 7–9, and Saturn A and B house grades 10 through to matriculation. The preschool and aftercare facilities operate in a complex called Solaria.

Luna piazza operated as a school quadrangle, extending from the Hall to the Pavilion and a large outcrop of geological rocks. The rock face and piazza were subsequently demolished, and the Pavilion was converted into an administrative extension of the present Primary School.

Uniform

The school originally required pupils to wear a T-shirt in any of the school's three colors, with black trousers or shorts, and any black footwear. Later, the uniform comprised a white golf shirt with a green collar and a jumper, paired with black shorts and black shoes. Accessories in the school's colors were permitted. Eventually, the school introduced a traditional blazer.

In high school, students are permitted to do what they wish with their hair, provided that it remains clean and tied up if it would otherwise touch their collars.

Learning structure
Aurora offers studies in various fields, ranging from business management, event management, and catering, to the ICDL and ITSI computer certificates.

Aurora is affiliated with the IEB independent assessment agency.

From grades 7–9 the subjects offered are English, Afrikaans/Zulu, Mathematics, Life Orientation, Human and Social Sciences, Natural Science, Economic Management Science, Physical Education, Computer literacy, Arts and Culture, and Technology.

From grades 10–12, English, Mathematics/Mathematics Literacy, Afrikaans/Zulu, Physical education, Travel and Tourism, and Life Orientation are compulsory, while three of the following subjects can be taken in addition: Economics, Business Studies, Physical Science, Life Science, History, Geography, Drama, Design, Consumer Studies, CAT, and IT.

References

External links
Aurora Private School

 Private schools in Gauteng
Schools in Johannesburg
 Educational institutions established in 1993
1993 establishments in South Africa